History of Technology is a book series publishing annual volumes since 1976, covering the history of technology in different countries and time periods. The books are published by the Continuum International Publishing Group. They have been edited by Ian Inkster since 2002.

See also 
 History of science and technology

External links
 List of volumes at Bloomsbury Publishing

Historiography of technology
Publications established in 1976